Erica W. Carlson is an American physicist specializing in superconductors, liquid crystals, and strongly correlated materials. She is 150th Anniversary Professor of Physics and Astronomy at Purdue University. As well as for her research, she is known for her work in physics education for quantum physics, and for her introduction of innovative technologies including podcasts and wikis into her physics teaching.

Education and career
Carlson is a 1994 graduate of the California Institute of Technology. She went to the University of California, Los Angeles for graduate study, earning a master's degree in 1995 and completing her Ph.D. in 2000.

After postdoctoral research at Boston University, she joined the Purdue faculty in 2003.

Recognition
Carlson was named a Fellow of the American Physical Society (APS) in 2015, after a nomination from the APS Division of Condensed Matter Physics, "for theoretical insights into the critical role of electron nematicity, disorder, and noise in novel phases of strongly correlated electron systems and predicting unique characteristics". Purdue University named her as a 150th Anniversary Professor in 2018.

Personal life
Carlson is Christian, and has spoken publicly about combining her religious faith with science.

References

External links
Carlson research group

Year of birth missing (living people)
Living people
American physicists
American women physicists
Physics educators
California Institute of Technology alumni
Purdue University faculty
Fellows of the American Physical Society